Spanish Fantasy (Spanish: Fantasía española) is a 1953 Spanish comedy film directed by Javier Setó and starring Antonio Casal, Ángel de Andrés and Trini Alonso.

Cast
 Antonio Casal as Rafael 
 Ángel de Andrés as Pepe  
 Trini Alonso as Choli 
 Paco Martínez Soria as Suave  
 Carmen de Ronda as Virginia  
 Carlos Otero as Jim  
 Barta Barri as Toscanelli 
 Mercedes Barranco 
 Antonio Casas 
 Modesto Cid 
 Emilia Clement 
 Jesús Colomer 
 Manuel Gas 
 Federico Górriz 
 Luis Induni 
 Pedro Mascaró 
 Jorge Morales
 Francisco Pigrau 
 María Dolores Pradera 
 José Sazatornil

References

Bibliography 
 Pascual Cebollada & Luis Rubio Gil. Enciclopedia del cine español: cronología''. Ediciones del Serbal, 1996.

External links 
 

1953 comedy films
Spanish comedy films
1953 films
1950s Spanish-language films
Films directed by Javier Setó
Spanish black-and-white films
1950s Spanish films